Pope Callixtus has been the papal name of three popes of the Catholic Church.

Pope Callixtus I (217–222)
Pope Callixtus II (1119–1124)
Pope Callixtus III (1455–1458)

See also 
 Antipope Callixtus III
 List of popes

Callixtus